The canton of Coligny is a former administrative division in eastern France. It was disbanded following the French canton reorganisation which came into effect in March 2015. It consisted of 9 communes, which joined the new canton of Saint-Étienne-du-Bois in 2015. It had 6,802 inhabitants (2012).

The canton comprised 9 communes:

Beaupont
Bény
Coligny
Domsure
Marboz
Pirajoux
Salavre
Verjon
Villemotier

Demographics

See also
Cantons of the Ain department 
Communes of France

References

Former cantons of Ain
2015 disestablishments in France
States and territories disestablished in 2015